Magasin (English: "Magazine") is a song by the Pinoy alternative rock band, Eraserheads, from their 1994 album Circus. It was the band's second hit single from the album. No music video was made for the song.

Composition
"Magasin" was based on Ely's cousin who dated Shirley Tesoro, a famous bold star who gained popularity for her roles in movies such as "Eye of the Eagle 2: Inside the Enemy" (1989) and "Maricris Sioson Story: Japayuki" (1993). The song's chorus was also inspired by Marvin Gaye's "Sexual Healing". The song was originally titled as "Titik".

Cover versions
 The song was first covered by Filipino trio APO Hiking Society from their final studio album, Banda Rito in 2001.
 Filipino Pop Acoustic Sensation Paolo Santos covered his version from the compilation album, Ultraelectromagnetic Jam in 2005.
 Filipina singer Yeng Constantino covered the song in 2010.
 Filipino rock band ChicoSci also covered their version from the compilation album, The Reunion: An Eraserheads Tribute Album in 2012.
 Tawag ng Tanghalan Contender Janine Berdin covered her version of Magasin and won the daily rounds during the Quarter 4, Season 2 of the singing contest

References

Eraserheads songs
1994 songs
1994 singles
Songs written by Ely Buendia
Tagalog-language songs